Alicia Lourteig (1913–2003) was an Argentine and French botanist, world specialist in Oxalidaceae.

Personal life and education
Alicia Lourteig was born in Buenos Aires, Argentina. Her parents originated from France and Argentina. She studied pharmacy and biochemistry at university in Buenos Aires, and her doctorate was awarded in 1946.

Career
Despite the subjects she studied at university, Lourteig's career was as a botanist, particularly as a taxonomist of the Lythraceae, Ranunculaceae, Mayacaceae and Oxalidaceae. Her interests extended to the history of botany in South America and the Antilles.

She was employed as a botanist from 1938 until 1947 at the Miguel Lillo Institute within the University of Tucuman. She then moved to the Darwinion Botanic Institute in San Isidro. She was able to visit other herbaria in America and Europe. These included the Royal Botanical Gardens, Kew, UK (1948 to 1950) and herbaria in Stockholm (1950-1951), Copenhagen (1951), Boston (1952-1953) and Washington (1953).

In 1955 she was recruited by the French National Centre for Scientific Research so moved to join the National Museum of Natural History, France as curator of the New World botanic collection. She contributed to the supplement of the Flore de France by Hippolyte Coste and revisions of the International Code of Botanical Nomenclature. She organised collections made by Aimé Bonpland (1773-1858), José Celestino Mutis (1732-1808), Surian and Charles Plumier (1646-1704) that were in the Paris museum. She became a research associate at the museum in 1979.

Lourteig collected plant materials in South America and also collected in the French Antarctic in 1963-1964 and 1969.

She was editor of the journal Lilloa.

Publications
Lourteig was the author or co-author of over 200 publications. Some of her most significant publications are:
 Piedrahita, SD; A Lourteig. (1991) Genesis De Una Flora. Ed. Academia Colombiana de Ciências Exactas, Fisicas y Naturales. 334 pp. 
 Lourteig, A. (1963) Flora del Uruguay, Mayacaceae, Zygophyllaceae, Celastraceae, Lythraceae, Primulaceae. Mus. Nac de Hist. Nat., Montevideo. 38 pp. 14 planchas
 Lourteig, A. (1956) Ranunculaceas de Sudamérica tropical pp. 19–88. Memoria, Soc. Ciências Naturales La Salle. 16: 43. Caracas 
 Lourteig, A; CA O'Donell. (1955) Las celastráceas de Argentina y Chile. BA : Ministério de Agricultura y Ganadería,  Serie: Publicación técnica, 15, pp 52
 Lourteig, A; CA O'Donell. (1943) Euphoriaceae of Argentina. Phyllantheae, Dalechampieae, Cluytiae, Manihoteae. Lilloa IX
 Lourteig, A; CA O'Donell. (1942) Acalypheae of Argentina (Euphorbiaceae) Lilloa VIII.

Awards
 the Millennium Award was presented to her at the XVI International Botanical Congress
 Lac Alicia in Australia Island, one of the Kerguelen Islands in French Antarctica is named after her
 a footpath in one of the Serro de Mar bio reserves in Brazil is named after her
 about 20 plant genera and species are named after her, including Alicia  from the Malpighiaceae family, Lourteigia  (from the Asteraceae family), and also Lourtella  from the family Lythraceae.

References

1913 births
2003 deaths
20th-century Argentine botanists
Argentine women scientists
People from Buenos Aires
20th-century women scientists
20th-century Argentine women writers
20th-century Argentine writers
Argentine emigrants to France